Joint Base Andrews (JBA) is a United States military facility located in Prince George's County, Maryland. The facility is under the jurisdiction of the United States Air Force 316th Wing, Air Force District of Washington (AFDW). The base was established in 2009, when Andrews Air Force Base and Naval Air Facility Washington were merged.

The base is named for Lieutenant General Frank Maxwell Andrews (1884–1943), former Commanding General of United States Armed Forces in the European Theater of Operations during World War II. The base is widely known for serving as the home base of two Boeing VC-25 aircraft which have the call sign Air Force One while the President of the United States is on board.

The host at Andrews is the 316th Wing, assigned to the Air Force District of Washington, which is also headquartered at Andrews. The 316th Wing is responsible for maintaining emergency reaction rotary-wing airlift and other National Capital Region contingency response capabilities critical to national security, and for organizing, training, equipping and deploying combat-ready forces for Air and Space Expeditionary Forces (AEFs).  Three other wings at Andrews are the reserve 459th Air Refueling Wing, Air National Guard's 113th Wing and active duty 89th Airlift Wing.

For statistical purposes the base is delineated as a census-designated place by the U.S. Census Bureau. As of the 2010 census, the resident population was 2,973.

History

Andrews Air Force Base 

In August 1942, President Franklin D. Roosevelt ordered the Secretary of War to acquire land to build a military airfield at the present site of Joint Base Andrews, with construction beginning later that year. On 19 April 1943, the first permanent unit arrived, the 463rd Base Headquarters and Air Base Squadron. 

Camp Springs Army Air Field became operational on 2 May 1943, when the first Republic P-47 Thunderbolt arrived. Camp Springs became Andrews Field on 2 May 1945 to honor one of the Air Force's founders, Lieutenant General Frank M. Andrews. Shortly after the Air Force became a separate service in 1947, the base's name changed to Andrews Air Force Base.

In the years following World War II, Andrews served as headquarters for Continental Air Command, Strategic Air Command and the Military Air Transport Service. It was also headquarters to the Air Research and Development Command and its successor, the Air Force Systems Command, from 1950 to 1992. Andrews was best known for its special air mission role, the transportation of senior government and military leaders. President Harry S. Truman was the first to fly a presidential flight out of Andrews on 24 November 1946. The port of entry and departure for dignitaries transferred to Andrews AFB in 1959, with Detachment 1 of the 1254th Air Transport Group receiving its first jet aircraft, a Boeing VC-137 Stratoliner the same year. While the president's official aircraft, a Lockeed C-121 Constellation (Columbine III), remained at Washington National Airport, the president often used the new VC-137 for longer trips. President John F. Kennedy's official aircraft, a Douglas VC-118, permanently transferred from Washington National in March 1962, and Andrews officially became the "Home of Air Force One".

Naval Air Facility Washington 

In 1958, when airspace around Naval Air Station Anacostia in Washington, D.C. became too crowded and Anacostia's runways were deemed too short, naval air activities were moved to Andrews Air Force Base to facilitate jet operations with a detachment of T-2V SeaStar jet trainers, the transfer being complete in December 1961.

Throughout the 1960s and into the early 1970s, Navy and Marine Reservists flew the AD-5 Skyraider, FJ-4B Fury, F-8U Crusader, RF-8G Photo Crusader, C-54 Skymaster and C-118 cargo aircraft, SP-2 Neptune aircraft and a variety of others. In April 1972, the Naval Air Reserve was reorganized into two tactical carrier wings (CVW-20 and CVW-30) with supporting transport and patrol squadrons.

In 1989, the Secretary of the Navy signed a new 25-year permit granting NAF Washington continued use of land on Andrews AFB.

At the start of 1993, NAF Washington D.C. Air Reservists continued to support naval activities with VMFA-321 flying the F/A-18 Hornet, VP-68 flying the P-3C Orion, VAQ-209 flying the EA-6B Prowler, Fleet Logistic Support Wing Detachment flying the C-20 Gulfstream and T-39 Sabreliner, VR-53 flying the C-130 Hercules and the NAF flying the UC-12B for the transportation of VIPs and light cargo.

By October 2006, Navy Operational Support Center (NOSC) Anacostia merged with NAF Washington. With this merger, NAF assumed the additional title of Naval District Washington Reserve Component Command. In September 2007, NOSC Adelphi in Maryland was disestablished and was merged with the reserve center at NAF Washington, creating the largest NOSC in the country.

2005 Base realignment and closure 
In May 2005, several recommendations relating to Andrews AFB were made by the Base Realignment and Closure (BRAC) Commission. The most significant was to realign Naval Air Facility Washington, by relocating its installation management functions to Andrews AFB, thereby establishing Joint Base Andrews-Naval Air Facility Washington.

BRAC also recommended relocating several offices of the Secretary of the Air Force to Andrews from leased office space in Arlington, Virginia, thereby reducing reliance on leased space and increasing the security of those activities by locating them within a military installation.

Other changes included the relocation of the Air Force Office of Special Investigations (AFOSI) headquarters from Andrews to Marine Corps Base Quantico, Virginia, and the relocation of the Air Force Flight Standards Agency (AFFSA) and its two C-21A to Will Rogers Air National Guard Base, Oklahoma.

On 1 October 2010, following the recommendations of the 2005 Base Realignment and Closure process, the Air Force completed the merger of the 11th Wing and the 316th at Joint Base Andrews. The 11th Wing became the host base organization for Joint Base Andrews.

Major commands to which assigned

Air Force District of Washington, 1 October 2009 – present

Major units assigned

459th Air Refueling Wing 2009–present
Malcolm Grow Medical Center, 2009–present
89th Airlift Wing, 2009–present
113th Wing, 2009-present
316th Wing, 2009-30 September 2010, 11 June 2020 – present
Air Force District of Washington, 2009–present
Headquarters, Air Force Office of Special Investigations
79th Medical Wing, 2009–2017
11th Wing, 2009–11 June 2020
On 11 June 2020, the 11th Wing moved back to its former station of Joint Base Anacostia Bolling and returned responsibility for Andrews to the reactivated 316th Wing, which assumed control of the personnel and units of the 11th Wing.

Role and operations

316th Wing 
The 316th Wing is the host wing for Joint Base Andrews, providing security, personnel, contracting, finance and infrastructure support for five wings, three headquarters, more than 80 tenant organizations, 148 geographically separated units, 6,500 personnel in the Pentagon, as well as 60,000 personnel and families in the National Capital Region and abroad. The wing operates several UH-1N Iroquois helicopters in support of daily and contingency operations in Washington, D.C. and it is also responsible for ceremonial support with the US Air Force Arlington Chaplaincy.

89th Airlift Wing 
The 89th Airlift Wing part of Air Mobility Command, is responsible for worldwide special air mission airlift, logistics and communications support for the President, Vice President and other senior US leaders. Air Force One is assigned to the 89th AW.

District of Columbia Air National Guard 
The 113th Wing is the air component of the District of Columbia National Guard. Its two flying units are the 121st Fighter Squadron and 201st Airlift Squadron. The 121st Fighter Squadron flies the F-16C/D Fighting Falcon multi-role fighter and provides protection to the airspace surrounding Washington, D.C. and also conducts overseas air-to-air and air-to-ground combat operations. The 201st Airlift Squadron operates the C-38A Courier and C-40C Clipper transport aircraft and provides an airlift capability to high-ranking military, government leadership, Congressional and White House delegations.

Air Force District of Washington 
Air Force District of Washington (AFDW) is the parent command to the 316th Wing and 844th Communications Group and the 11th Wing at Joint Base Anacostia-Bolling. AFDW provides personnel and support for Air Force activities within the National Capital Region (NCR) and approximately 33,000 personnel and civilians performing duties in more than 500 locations across more than 100 countries. The 11th Wing at Anacostia-Bolling is home to the US Air Force Band and US Air Force Honor Guard, and as the host unit, executes critical national security mission support for approximately 70 mission partners. Finally, the 844th Communications Group at Andrews provides communications, information technology systems, services and management to the Department of the Air Force, AFDW, the National Military Command Center, and their tenant units.

Based units 
Flying and notable non-flying units based at Joint Base Andrews Naval Air Facility Washington.

United States Air Force 

Air Force District of Washington (AFDW)

 Headquarters Air Force District of Washington
 316th Wing (Host Wing)
 316th Wing Staff Agencies
 316th Comptroller Squadron
 316th Operations Group
 1st Helicopter Squadron – UH-1N Iroquois
 316th Operations Support Squadron
 316th Medical Group
 316th Aerospace Medical Squadron
 316th Dental Squadron
 316th Medical Operations Squadron
 316th Medical Squadron
 316th Medical Support Squadron
 316th Surgical Squadron
 316th Mission Support Group
 316th Civil Engineer Squadron
 316th Contracting Squadron
 316th Force Support Squadron
 316th Logistics Readiness Squadron
 316th Security Forces Group
 316th Security Forces Squadron
 316th Security Support Squadron
 816th Security Forces Squadron
 844th Communications Group
 744th Communications Squadron

Air Mobility Command (AMC)

 Eighteenth Air Force
 89th Airlift Wing
 89th Airlift Wing Staff Agencies
 89th Operations Group
 1st Airlift Squadron – C-32A and C-40B
 99th Airlift Squadron – C-37A and C-37B
 89th Operations Support Squadron
 Presidential Airlift Group
 Presidential Airlift Squadron – VC-25A
 Presidential Logistics Squadron
 89th Airlift Support Group
 89th Communications Squadron
 89th Aerial Port Squadron
 89th Maintenance Group

Air Force Materiel Command (AFMC)
 Air Force Installation and Mission Support Center
 Detachment 5 (GSU)

Air Combat Command (ACC)
 First Air Force
 Civil Air Patrol-US Air Force (CAP-USAF)
 Detachment 2 (GSU)

Field Operating Agencies

 Air Force Legal Operations Agency
 Air Force Review Boards Agency
 Air National Guard Readiness Center

Air Force Reserve Command (AFRC)

 Fourth Air Force
 459th Air Refueling Wing
 Headquarters 459th Air Refueling Wing
 459th Operations Group
 459th Aeromedical Evacuation Squadron
 459th Operations Support Squadron
 756th Air Refueling Squadron – KC-135R Stratotanker
 459th Maintenance Group
 459th Aircraft Maintenance Squadron
 459th Maintenance Squadron
 459th Mission Support Group
 69th Aerial Port Squadron
 459th Civil Engineering Flight
 459th Force Support Squadron
 459th Logistics Readiness Squadron
 459th Security Forces Squadron
 759th Logistics Readiness Flight
 459th Aeromedical Staging Squadron
 459th Aerospace Medicine Squadron

Air National Guard (ANG)

 District of Columbia Air National Guard
 113th Wing
 113th Wing Staff Agencies
 113th Operations Group
 121st Fighter Squadron – F-16C/D Fighting Falcon
 201st Airlift Squadron – C-38A Courier and C-40C
 113th Operations Support Squadron
 Air Sovereignty Detachment
 113th Maintenance Group
 113th Maintenance Squadron
 113th Aircraft Generation Squadron
 113th Maintenance Operations Flight
 113th Medical Group
 113th Mission Support Group
 113th Civil Engineer Squadron
 113th Communications Flight
 113th Logistics Readiness Squadron
 113th Mission Support Contracting
 113th Mission Support Flight
 113th Security Forces Squadron
 113th Services Flight

Civil Air Patrol (CAP)
 National Headquarters
 CAP Congressional Squadron (GSU)
 Mid-Atlantic Region
 National Capital Wing
 Andrews Composite Squadron (DC-033)

United States Army 

 US Army Military District of Washington
 US Army Air Operations Group
 US Army Priority Air Transport – C-37A/B

United States Marine Corps 
US Marine Corps Reserve (USMCR)

 4th Marine Aircraft Wing
 Marine Aircraft Group 49
 Marine Transport Squadron Andrews (VMR Andrews) – UC-35D Citation

United States Navy 
US Navy Reserve Force

 Commander Naval Air Force Reserve (CNAFR)
 Naval Air Facility Washington
 Headquarters Naval Air Facility Washington
 Aviation Support Detachment Washington
 Commander Fleet Logistics Support Wing
 Fleet Logistics Support Squadron One (VR-1) – C-37B
 Fleet Logistics Support Squadron Five Three (VR-53) – C-130T Hercules

Region Mid-Atlantic, Reserve Component Command (RCC)

 Navy Operational Support Center (NOSC) Washington

Commander Fleet Readiness Center (COMFRC)

 Fleet Readiness Center Mid-Atlantic

Tenth Fleet (US Fleet Cyber Command)

 Navy Communication Security Material System (NCMS) Command
 Information Dominance Corps Region Headquarters

Office of Naval Intelligence

 Kennedy Irregular Warfare Center

Geography 
Joint Base Andrews is situated a few miles southeast of Washington, D.C. near the town of Morningside. It is delineated as a census-designated place by the United States Census Bureau.

The minor third runway between them at the top of the picture (above the cross-base roadway) is now closed, and the small T-shaped runway at the bottom right of the opening picture was closed and demolished by 2008.

Demographics
For statistical purposes the base is delineated as a census-designated place (Andrews AFB CDP) by the U.S. Census Bureau. As of the 2020 census, the resident population was 3,025.

Housing
The family housing, privatized, is operated and owned by Liberty Park at Andrews.

Facilities for residents
The U.S. Postal Service operates the Andrews AFB Post Office.

Joint Base Andrews CDP is served by the Prince George's County Public Schools (PGCPS). Residents of the CDP are zoned to Francis T. Evans Elementary School, Stephen Decatur Middle School, and Dr. Henry A Wise Jr. High School.

Evans Elementary, within the CDP, has a Clinton postal address and opened in 1968. Its namesake is Captain Francis T. Evans, who died when his plane crashed in Prince George's County; according to the school's website, it is believed that he did not bail out since he did not want his aircraft to hit Forestville Elementary School.

There is also a charter school, Imagine Andrews Public Charter School (IAPCS), which opened in 2010. Imagine Schools operates Imagine Andrews, which is a joint venture between it, PGCPS, and Joint Base Andrews. The school reserves 65% of its enrollment spaces for children of military families.

Expo 

The Joint Base Andrews  Air & Space Expo is a free airshow that happens every 2 years featuring the United States Air Force Thunderbirds and the Navy's Blue Angels. A variety of presentations from military services and other organizations included the KC-135, the F-16 Fighting Falcon, the Boeing B-52 Stratofortress, and the UH-1N Iroquois.

Official insignia
The installation commander of Joint Base Andrews approved a logo re-design in the spring of 2014, which aimed to improve the branding and the overall appearance of the installation across all platforms. The project took several months and went through numerous design changes before approval, but was finalized in the late summer. The new JBA logo project was led and chiefly designed by Senior Airman Dan Burkhardt with important contributions by Mr. Dean Markos, who were both serving the Air Force in the 11th Wing Public Affairs office. The logo was approved and disseminated across all digital platforms and marketed locally in the fall of 2014.

The new logo was re-designed with a flatter, more modern design aesthetic that could comfortably occupy a number of different mediums, from mobile apps, to installation trucks and signs. Contained in it are a number of design elements that refer directly to the joint mission of the installation, which is home to several Air Force Major Commands, Naval Commands, a Marine detachment and a number of other military and government related units.

Design elements
U.S. Capitol Building: The Capitol Building refers to the location of the installation (just outside Washington D.C.) and critical role it plays in supporting the operations and leadership of the U.S. Government.
Dual Planes with Contrails: The two planes taking off with contrails flowing downward signify the aerial missions that Joint Base Andrews either hosts or supports directly every day, including the operations and maintenance of Air Force One.
America's Airfield: This phrase (one of several unofficial tag-lines of the installation) refers to the mission-critical role that Joint Base Andrews plays in national defense, government and diplomacy.
Joint Base Andrews Naval Air Facility Washington: Unlike the previous logo design, the new design incorporates the official name of the installation in the post-BRAC era.

See also
 List of United States Air Force installations

Notes

References 

 

Attribution:

External links 

 

 Joint Base Andrews Air & Space Expo 2019

Joint bases of the U.S. Department of Defense
Airports in Maryland
Military installations in Maryland
Populated places in Prince George's County, Maryland
Buildings and structures in Prince George's County, Maryland
1945 establishments in Maryland
Military airbases established in 1945